Tokyo 10th district is a constituency of the House of Representatives in the Diet of Japan (national legislature). As of 2012, 351,821 eligible voters were registered in the district. It covers northwestern parts of the former city of Tokyo. Originally it consisted of the ward of Toshima and parts of Nerima, but after redistricting in 2017 it comprises parts of four wards, Toshima, Nerima, Nakano and Shinjuku.

Before the electoral reform of 1994, the area had been part of Tokyo 5th district where three Representatives had been elected by single non-transferable vote. Until her successful gubernatorial bid in 2016, Liberal Democrat Yuriko Koike had represented the district. Koike, formerly a representative for Hyōgo 6th district, had taken over Tokyo 10th district in 2005 as one of Jun’ichirō Koizumi's "female assassins" to take out postal privatization rebel Kōki Kobayashi. In the landslide election of 2009, she lost the district to Takako Ebata (DPJ, Ozawa group), one of the so-called "Ozawa girls" (小沢ガールズ, Ozawa gāruzu), a group of female first-time candidates handpicked by DPJ ex-chairman Ichirō Ozawa.

The current representative, elected in the 2017 general election, is Hayato Suzuki.

List of representatives

Election results

References 

Districts of the House of Representatives (Japan)
Politics of Tokyo